István Kovács (born 16 September 1984) is a Romanian football referee who officiates primarily in the Liga I. He has been a full international for FIFA since 2010 and a UEFA elite referee since 2019.

Career
Kovács was selected for Euro 2020 alongside his compatriot Ovidiu Hațegan. He was in charge of one group stage game between the Netherlands and North Macedonia.

On 26 April 2022, Kovács officiated the first leg of the UEFA Champions League semi-final between Manchester City and Real Madrid, which the English side won 4–3. After a good performance, Kovács was praised by the media especially for the advantage let before Bernardo Silva's goal. As a reward, the UEFA Referees Committee chose him to officiate the 2022 UEFA Europa Conference League final.

On 25 May 2022, Kovács was in charge of the 2022 UEFA Europa Conference League final between A.S. Roma and Feyenoord, the first final in this competition.

István Kovács was appointed for the 2022 FIFA World Cup along with his compatriot assistant referees Vasile Marinescu and Mihai Artene. He was the fourth official in eight matches, but did not referee any games at the tournament.

On 19 January 2023, Kovács refereed the final of the 25th Arabian Gulf Cup between Iraq and Oman.

In January 2023, he was one of six match officials appointed for the 2022 FIFA Club World Cup in Morocco. On 7 February, he oversaw the semi-final between Flamengo and Al Hilal.

Personal life
Born in Carei to a Hungarian father and a Swabian mother, Kovács is a dual citizen, having acquired Hungarian citizenship in 2011. His younger brother, Szabolcs, is also a referee in the Liga I.

Honours
 Honorary Citizen of Carei (2023)

See also
 List of FIFA international referees

References

External links

 
 
 
 

1984 births
Living people
People from Carei
Romanian football referees
UEFA Champions League referees
UEFA Europa League referees
UEFA Euro 2020 referees
2022 FIFA World Cup referees
FIFA World Cup referees
Romanian people of Hungarian descent
Romanian people of German descent
Citizens of Hungary through descent
Romanian schoolteachers